Luftschiffhafen Seddin, named after a tiny place in Landkreis Stolp in Pomerania, was a base (Luftschiffhafen) for Schütte-Lanz airships during World War I.

The large hangar survived until 1989 when it burned down.

Pomerania
World War I airfields
Geography of Pomerania
World War I sites in Germany